The Town of Cambridge is a local government area in the inner western suburbs of the Western Australian capital city of Perth, about  west of Perth's central business district and extending to the Indian Ocean at City Beach. It was originally part of the City of Perth before the restructuring by the Western Australian State Government in 1994.

History
Historically the area was part of the North Perth municipality, gazetted in 1901, which was absorbed into the City of Perth in 1915 after becoming unsustainable as an autonomous political entity. In 1993 the Government of Western Australia decided to split up the local government area (LGA) of the City of Perth, creating three additional LGAs and retaining a smaller City of Perth. The new LGAs were Town of Vincent, Town of Cambridge and the Town of Victoria Park.

In October 2020, the Town won an injunction against the state government's efforts to suspend the Council due to suspicions about interference in Town administration. This was the first time a local government in Western Australia successfully challenged ministerial authority to suspend a Council.

Parks and reserves
Cambridge has many parks and reserves. The Town has two major reserves, Lake Monger and Perry Lakes, as well as 4.8 km of coastline, including City Beach and Floreat Beach and their respective parks, and the nearby dunes.

Wards
The city has been divided into 2 wards, each electing 4 councillors.

 Coast Ward 
 Wembley Ward

Suburbs
The suburbs of the Town of Cambridge with population and size figures based on the most recent Australian census:

(* indicates suburb only partially located within Town)

Population

Heritage listed places

As of 2023, 135 places are heritage-listed in the Town of Cambridge, of which 14 are on the State Register of Heritage Places, among them the Model Brick Home and Model Timber Home.

References

External links
 

 
Cambridge